The Centrist Coalition  was a centrist electoral alliance in Egypt made up of the Civilization Party
and the Wasat Party . The coalition originally included more parties, including: El-Sarh El-Masry Party, Ghad El-Thawra Party, the Virtue Party, the Authenticity Party, the Strong Egypt Party, the Reform and Renaissance Party, and the Egyptian Current Party. The Wasat Party became part of the Anti-Coup Alliance, though it left the alliance on 28 August 2014.

References

2013 establishments in Egypt
Defunct political party alliances in Egypt